Hora Svaté Kateřiny is a town in Most District in the Ústí nad Labem Region of the Czech Republic. It has about 400 inhabitants.

Administrative parts
Hamlets of Malý Háj and Rudolice v Horách are administrative parts of Hora Svaté Kateřiny.

Geography
It lies on the Czech-German border. It is adjacent to the municipality of Deutschneudorf in Saxony.

Hora Svaté Kateřiny lies in the Ore Mountains.

The Kateřinský stream, a left tributary of Schweinitz, passes through the municipal territory. The southern boundary of the territory follows approximately the Telčský stream, a right tributary of Natzschung.

Etymology
The settlement was originally named Hallberg, which originated from the name Kupferhall for an old mine. According to a legend, a maid came across silver while mowing the grass, and the town was named after the patron saint of the miners, Saint Catherine of Alexandria. A historically more likely explanation is that the settlement was renamed Katharinaberg after the sister of the ore discoverer Hans Georg, who had previously named after himself and his sisters Johanngeorgenstadt, Marienberg, and Annaberg. The name Hora Svaté Kateřiny literally means "Saint Catherine's Mountain".

History
The first written mention of the settlement is from 1480, when Lorenz Glatz of Altenhorst acquired the mines in 1473 and opened new ones as well as a smeltery. In 1516 his sister Anna, the wife of military leader and mining entrepreneur Sebastian von Weitmühl, inherited the property. Silver was struck in the 16th century, leading to a significant boom of the community which in 1528 was elevated to the status of a royal mining town. Towards the end of the 16th century, the town passed into the hands of emperor Rudolf II. It had about 177 houses and up to 2,500 inhabitants at this time.

Upon changing hands in 1605, the smelting works were closed and the copper ore brought to Grünthal near Olbernhay in Saxony for processing. The new owners hat little interest in continuing the mines, and overruled the privileges hitherto conceded to the mining towns and the miners. The inhabitants were burdened with socage despite the interventions of emperors Rudolf II and Ferdinand II. Instead of mining, the weaving of linen was taken up on a large scale. The evangelical church, which was begun in 1607 and consecrated in 1611, passed in the course of Counter-Reformation, upon compulsory conversion of the populace to Catholicism in 1627, to the patronage of the Jesuits of Dux in 1632.

During the Thirty Years' War the town suffered from troops passing through or taking quarters there, who also carried away food and property, from famine and epidemies, and from robber gangs. Further epidemies in 1680 and emigration reduced the population by 55 families, and only 70 houses were still inhabited, while 65 lay in ruins. In the early 18th century, knitting supplemented the linen industry, and inhabitants of St. Katharinaberg also supplied the cloth manufacturers in Oberleutensdorf. Mining flourished again until the late 1760s, but ceased completely in 1786. During the Seven Years' War the town was raided 14 times by Prussian troops, with financial damages amounting to 21,736 florins.

Agriculture had never been practiced in the town to any large extent, and animal husbandry and forestry provided little income. Thus, many families went to work in nearby Brandov or across the border in Saxony. In 1850, the town had become the seat of a judicial district, a notary's office, a post and telegraph office, a police station, and a customs office. In the 19th century, wood working was taken up on an industrial scale and prospered, so that in 1874 a vocational school for this sector was established in St. Katharinaberg, but moved to Oberleutensdorf five years later. A fire in 1904 destroyed 44 homes.

In 1933, the town had 1,544 inhabitants, 65% of which were industry workers, 17% worked in commerce, 10% in agriculture, and 8% were public servants. 98% of the population were of German ethnicity. After World War II, the Germans were expelled, causing the municipality to be depopulated and to lose its town privileges. These were only restored on 2 April 2008. The main source of income is now tourism.

Plans to expand the nearby lignite surface mine threatened the continuity of road communications in the area, which lead the mayor, Lukáš Pakosta, in 2015 to publicly consider joining the town to Germany. This caused a political controversy.

Demographics

Transport
The municipality is only accessed by secondary roads, chiefly road No. 25220 between the Czech-German border near Olbernhau and Boleboř, No. 25219 between Hora Svaté Kateřiny and Mikulovice), and No. 25218 connecting the two. A road border crossing on a bridge across Schweinitz river connects the town with Deutschkatharinenberg, a part of Deutschneudorf.

Sights

There is an observation tower on Růžový vrch. A wooden extension was built around the base of the tower to serve as exhibition space. Near the observation tower is the Monument to Anton Günther.

The Church of Saint Catherine was built in 1611–1612 and baroque rebuilt in 1785. The tower also dates from 1785. The sculpture of a Pietà in front of the church dates from 1729. The rectory opposite the church dates from 1680.

There is a Marian column wit ha statue of the Virgin Mary on the town square.

Mikulášská štola ("Adit of Saint Nicholas") is the most famous silver and copper adit in the Ore Mountains. The corridors reach a depth of up to  underground. Today they are flooded, about 420 m of the adit is reconstructed and open to the public.

Notable people
Gerhard Grimmer (born 1943), German cross-country skier

References

External links

Populated places in Most District
Cities and towns in the Czech Republic
Villages in the Ore Mountains